The Green Left and the Social Democrats had won the mayor's position following the elections that had been held in Lejre Municipality since the 2007 municipal reform. The traditional red bloc had won 13 of the 25 seats in the last election, which saw Carsten Rasmussen from the Social Democrats win the mayor's position.  

Mandag Morgen who had published an article prediciting the 98 mayors that would follow the 2017 Danish local elections, expected him to win re-election. 

However, the result would not end this way. Conservatives, Green Left and Danish People's Party would be the parties that would have a chage in number of seats won. While the latter two both lost a seat, the Conservatives gained 2. This meant that the traditional blue bloc now had 13 seats and a majority. This led to Tina Mandrup from Venstre becoming mayor.

Electoral system
For elections to Danish municipalities, a number varying from 9 to 31 are chosen to be elected to the municipal council. The seats are then allocated using the D'Hondt method and a closed list proportional representation.
Lejre Municipality had 25 seats in 2021

Unlike in Danish General Elections, in elections to municipal councils, electoral alliances are allowed.

Electoral alliances  

Electoral Alliance 1

Electoral Alliance 2

Electoral Alliance 3

Electoral Alliance 4

Results

Notes

References 

Lejre